This is a list of the named geological faults affecting the rocks of Wales. See the main article on faults for a fuller treatment of fault types and nomenclature but in brief, the main types are normal faults, reverse faults, thrusts or thrust faults and strike-slip faults. Many faults may have acted as both normal faults at one time and as reverse or thrust faults at another and may or may not have also incorporated some degree of strike-slip movement too. Fault zones, fault belts and fault complexes typically describe assemblages of faults which have a common origin and history and whose alignments tend to be sub-parallel to one another.

There are also a number of 'disturbances', notably in South Wales. These linear features are a combination of faults and folds - the relative importance of faulting and folding varying along the length of each disturbance.

Key to tables 
Column 1 indicates the name of the fault. Note that different authors may use different names for the same fault or a section of it. Coversely the same name may be applied to more than one fault, particularly in the case of smaller faults which are widely separated. Names are as they appear in the literature and do not necessarily conform to the commonly accepted modern spelling or form of the place-names with which they are associated.
Column 2 indicates the OS grid reference of the approximate midpoint of certain faults. Note that the mapped extent of a fault may not accurately reflect its actual extent.
Column 3 indicates the county in which the fault occurs. Some traverse two or more counties of course.
Column 4 indicates on which sheet, if any, of the British Geological Survey's 1:50,000 / 1" scale geological map series of England and Wales, the fault is shown and named (either on map/s or cross-section/s or both). Also listed are a handful of BGS maps at other scales, where the fault is both shown and named.
Column 5 indicates a selection of publications in which references to the fault may be found. See references section for full details of publication.

Alphabetical lists of faults

A

B

C

D

E

F

G

H

I,J,K

L

M

N

O

P,Q

R

S

T

U,V

W,X,Y,Z

List of Disturbances 
The following named features comprise both faulting and folding;

See also
 List of geological faults of England
 List of geological faults of Northern Ireland
 List of geological faults of Scotland
 List of geological folds in Great Britain
 Geological structure of Great Britain

References

Maps
 1:625,000 scale geological map 2007, Bedrock Geology UK South, British Geological Survey, Keyworth, Notts (UK (south) 625K)
 1:250,000 scale geological map Mid Wales and the Marches, British Geological Survey, Keyworth, Notts (MW & M 250K)
 various of 1:50,000 scale geological maps of England and Wales, British Geological Survey, Keyworth, Notts (E & W no.)
 1:25,000 scale sheet Usk - Cwmbran in Classic Areas of British Geology series, British Geological Survey, Keyworth, Notts (Usk-Cwm: 25K)

Books
 Brenchley, PJ & Rawson, PF (eds) 2006. The Geology of England and Wales, (2nd edn) The Geological Society, London (Brenchley & Rawson 2006)
 Cave, R. & Hains, B.A, 2001 Geology of the country around Montgomery and the Ordovician rocks of the Shelve area Memoir of the British Geological Survey. Sheet 165 with part of sheet 151 (Welshpool) (England and Wales).(Mem E&W 165/151)
 Smith et al. 2005 Structure & Evolution of the south-west Pennine Basin and adjacent area. Subsurface memoir of the British Geological Survey. (Smith et al. 2005)
 Toghill, P 2006 Geology of Shropshire (2nd edn) Crowood Press, Wilts (Toghill P 2006)
 Warren et al. 1984, Geology of the country around Rhyl and Denbigh, Mem Br Geol Svy, sheets 95 and 107 (Mem E&W 95/107)
 Welch, FBA & Trotter, FM 1961 Geology of the Country around Monmouth and Chepstow, HMSO (explanation of 1" geol. sheets 233 & 250 (England and Wales) (Welch, FBA & Trotter, FM 1961)

Geology of Wales
Structural geology
Wales
Geological faults of Wales
Geological faults of Wales